New music may refer to:

Musical styles and movements
Pre-20th century
 Ars nova, musical style in 14th-century France and the Low Countries
 Le nuove musiche, collection of monody by Giulio Caccini
 New German School, music style in late 19th-century Germany

20th–21st century
 Neue Musik, collective term for many different currents of composed, Central European influenced music from about 1910 to the present
 New-age music, a genre of music intended to create inspiration, relaxation and optimism
 New wave music, late 1970s and the 1980s with ties to mid-1970s punk rock
 New musick, an early name for post-punk
 New music (Japanese genre), a Japanese pop music style from the 1970s
 New Pop, British synthesizer-based music made popular by MTV in the 1980s
 New Romantic, a pop culture movement in the UK in the early 1980s
 New rave music
 Contemporary classical music, mid-1970s or 1945 to late 2010s

Other
 New Musik, an English synthpop band
 New Music America, festival held throughout the 1980s
 New music, a poetic movement of the second half of the 5th century BC Dithyramb#History
 The NewMusic, a weekly television news magazine in Canada

See also
 Modern music (disambiguation)